Aleksa Spasić (1831 - 1920) was a Serbian economist and minister.

Biography
Aleksa Spasić was Minister of Finance from 1883 to 1884, deputy minister of the national economy, first governor of the National Bank of Serbia (1884), director of the Board of Funds, member of the Serbian Learned Society, and an honorary member of the Serbian Royal Academy.

Aleksa Spasić learned financial techniques and imparted knowledge in the civil service positions he held in Serbia. He mostly wrote in the decade from 1867 to 1876. He belonged to the School of Classical economics (revered by John Stuart Mill and Adam Smith), a prominent liberal. He emphasized the importance of good institutions for the well-being of the people (constitutionality, freedom, property protection, free political institutions, democracy), then austerity and moderate taxes. He was a critic of despotism.

Works
 States and Finance, 1867
 Institutions and National Treasure, 1868
 Banks and bankers, 1870
 Finances and nations, 1871
 Municipal finances in France and England, 1874
 The most important issues in political economy, 1875-1876

See also
 Vladimir Matijević
 Lazar Bačić

References 

 Marjanović, Gavro. An advocate of classical civic political economy in 19th century Serbia: Aleksa N. Spasić. [Belgrade: b. i., 1978] (Belgrade: Culture). p. 1-20.

1831 births
1920 deaths
Serbian economists
Finance ministers of Serbia
Governors of the National Bank of Serbia